Gençlerbirliği Spor Kulübü (pronounced ), commonly known as Gençlerbirliği, is a Turkish sports club based in Ankara. Formed in 1923, Gençlerbirliği are nicknamed Ankara Rüzgârı (The Wind of Ankara) or simply Gençler (The Youth). The club colours are black and red. The football team currently plays its home matches at Eryaman Stadium, following the closure of the Ankara 19 Mayıs.

Domestically, the club have won the Turkish Cup twice, in 1987 and 2001. They have also won the former Turkish Football Championship twice and the regional Ankara Football League a record nine times. In Europe, Gençlerbirliği's greatest success came in 2004. The club reached the fourth round of the UEFA Cup before losing to eventual champions Valencia.

History

Gençlerbirliği were founded in a slightly different way compared to many other football clubs, having been established by students from a high school, Ankara Erkek Lisesi (Sultani Mektebi). The students in question (Ramiz Eren, Mennan İz, Mazhar Atacanlı, Sait, Kenan, Nuri, Namık Katoğlu, Namık Ambarcıoğlu, Rıdvan Kırmacı, Hafi Araç, Ruhi, Sarı Ziya and Hakkı) had failed to be selected for their own school team, and asked one of their student friends, Asim, to talk with his father about setting up a football team for them to show how well they could play.

On 14 March 1923, Asim's father, the member of parliament from Muş Province, established the team for his son and his friends. Since all the members of the team were students he chose the name 'Youth Union' (Turkish: Gençlerbirliği). They elected Sarı Ziya's father Faik Bey as their first chairman.

Subsequently, these young students wanted to play against the school team which had not selected them. Gençlerbirliği won the game, played at "Hamit tarlası", 3–0. According to these young rebellious players this victory forged the identity of their new team.

They won the regional Ankara Football League a record nine times between 1923 and 1959, when the league had first level status before the introduction of a nationwide league. Their greatest success domestically were the victories in the former Turkish Football Championship, when they became Turkish champions in 1941 and 1946. Gençler entered the Turkish National League in 1959 and played 12 seasons until relegation in the 1969–70 season. They played in the second level until relegation to third level in the 1978–79 season. The club came back to second level after the merger of the third level with second level, at the end of the 1979–80 season. They finished second from last in Group A of the Second League, and had to relegate to the regional league. But, since the number of teams in the second division was increased, Gençlerbirliği were readmitted. The club won Group D in the 1982–83 season and finally returned to the top-flight after 13 years. They relegated again in 1987–88 season. Finally, Gençlerbirliği returned to the top-flight in the 1988–89 season, in their first return attempt. Gençlerbirliği's most successful seasons in the Süper Lig are 1965–66 and 2002–03, when they reached the third place. At the end of the 2017–18 season Gençler only reached the 17th place and as a result the club relegated to the second tier TFF First League.

Colors
There are two rumors about how Gençlerbirliği got their team colors, black and red:
 The young students went to a local haberdashers and the only available colors were black and red. They purchased these colors to sew their own kit. 
 The outskirts of Ankara during spring time see plenty of poppy flowers (Gelincik) blooming and Gençlerbirliği selected the red and black of this flower for their colors. Gençlerbirliği merchandise in their store is usually called Gelincik by their supporters.

Rivalry
Gençlerbirliği's arch-rival are the neighbouring club Ankaragücü and games between the clubs are considered as the "Derby of the Capital".

Youth academy and scouting
Gençlerbirliği have always been one of the teams in Turkey most notable for their talented young footballers that they procure through scouting both in Turkey and throughout Europe and Africa. For example, Geremi was scouted and raised by the club, transferred to Real Madrid and later Chelsea. Another of Gençlerbirliği's young stars Isaac Promise received the 2005–06 Super League Individual Youth player of the Year award.

Gençlerbirliği had been run by İlhan Cavcav from 1978 until his death in 2017. With Cavcav's help, Gençlerbirliği have become one of the more stable clubs in Turkey. This has been achieved mainly through the departure of the most talented players every season to the other clubs in Turkey. Departing players are usually replaced with much cheaper imports from Turkey, Europe or Africa.

Honours

Domestic competitions
Turkish Football Championship
 Winners (2): 1941, 1946
 Runners-up (1): 1950

TFF First League
 Winners (2): 1982-83, 1988-89
 Runners-up (1): 2018-19

Turkish Cup
 Winners (2): 1986–87, 2000–01
 Runners-up (3): 2002–03, 2003–04, 2007–08

Turkish Super Cup
 Runners-up (1): 1987

Prime Minister's Cup
 Runners-up (1): 1946

Regional competitions
Ankara Football League
 Winners (10) (record): 1929-30, 1930-31, 1931-32, 1932-33, 1934-35, 1939-40, 1940-41, 1945-46, 1949-50, 1950-51
 Runners-up (7): 1926, 1926–27, 1929, 1934, 1936–37, 1942–43, 1947–48

Ankara Shield
 Winners (3) : 1931, 1935, 1940-41

Others
 TSYD Cup
 Winners (16): 1969, 1985, 1986, 1989, 1993, 1994, 1998, 2002, 2003, 2006, 2010, 2011, 2012, 2016, 2019, 2021

European participations

UEFA Cup Winners' Cup

UEFA Cup / UEFA Europa League

UEFA Intertoto Cup

Balkans Cup

UEFA Ranking history

Players

Current squad

Out on loan

Most capped players
{| class="wikitable" style="text-align: center;"
|-
!
!Player
!Caps
!Period
|-
|1
|align="left"| Tevfik Kutlay
|353
|1959–72
|-
|2
|align="left"| Selçuk Çakmaklı
|336
|1959–72
|-
|3
|align="left"| Avni Okumuş
|317
|1983–93
|-
|4
|align="left"| Zeynel Soyuer
|291
|1959–71
|-
|5
|align="left"| Nihat Baştürk
|279
|1994–2005
|-
|6
|align="left"| Metin Diyadin
|265
|1988–98
|-
|7
|align="left"| Orhan Yüksel
|235
|1959–66
|-
|8
|align="left"| Mehmet Şimşek
|228
|1993–2001
|-
|9
|align="left"| İhsan Temen
|219
|1959-66
|-
|10
|align="left"| Okan Gedikali
|207
|1982–91

Top goalscorers
{| class="wikitable" style="text-align: center;"
|-
!
!Player
!Goals (Caps)
!Period
|-
|1
|style="text-align:left;"| Andre Kona N'Gole
|72 (145)
|1993–2001
|-
|2
|style="text-align:left;"| Avni Okumuş
|71 (317)
|1983–1993
|-
|3
|style="text-align:left;"| Orhan Yüksel
|67 (235)
|1959–1966
|-
|4
|style="text-align:left;"| Ümit Karan
|59 (150)
|1996–2001
|-
|5
|style="text-align:left;"| Souleymane Youla
|57 (134)
|2001–2005
|-
|6
|style="text-align:left;"| Bogdan Stancu
|55 (139)
|2013-2020
|-
|7
|style="text-align:left;"| Abdullah Çevrim
|50 (154)
|1961–1966
|-
|8
|style="text-align:left;"| Zeynel Soyuer
|47 (291)
|1959–1971
|-
|9
|style="text-align:left;"| Tevfik Kutlay
|46 (353)
|1959–1972
|-
|10
|style="text-align:left;"| Muammer Nurlu
|44 (152)
|1983–1989
|-

Former players
See :Category:Gençlerbirliği S.K. footballers

Coaches

 Yüksel Doğanay (1960–70)
 Oktay Arıca (1970–71)
 Kazım Türesin (1971–72)
 Yüksel Doğanay (1972–73)
 Fehmi Baştüzel (1973–74)
 Tevfik Kutlay (1975)
 Avni Bulduk (1975)
 Fehmi Baştüzel (1975–76)
 Avni Bulduk (1976)
 Oktay Arıca (1976–77)
 Ruhi Yavuz (1977–78)
 Fehmi Baştüzel (1978–81)
 Mümtaz Tümer (1981)
 Fehmi Baştüzel (1981)
 Enver Ürekli (1981)
 Ergun Berksoy (1981–95)
 Teoman Yamanlar (1981–82)
 Kadri Aytaç (1982–83)
 Tınaz Tırpan (30 June 1983 – 31 May 1985)
 Erkan Kural (1985–86)
 Metin Türel (1986–87)
 Hüsnü Macurni (1987)
 Tınaz Tırpan (30 June 1987 – 31 May 1988)
 Kadri Aytaç (1988)
 İbrahim Aydın (1988)
 Teoman Yamanlar (1988)
 Erkan Kural (1988–89)
 Gündüz Tekin Onay (1989–90)
 Metin Türel (1990)
 Jozef Jarabinský (1 July 1990 – 30 June 1991)
 Aldoğan Argon (1991–92)
 Battal Tokyay (1992)
 Valeri Nepomniachi (1 July 1992 – 30 June 1993)
 Gurban Berdyýew (1993–94)
 Augusto Palacios (1994)
 Zafer Göncüler (1994–95)
 Metin Türel (1995)
 Georges Heylens (1995–96)
 Metin Türel (1996)
 Sadi Tekelioğlu (1996–97)
 Teoman Yamanlar (1997)
 Luka Peruzović (1 July 1997 – 21 Oct 1997)
 Yılmaz Vural (19 Nov 1997 – 30 June 1998)
 Karol Pecze (1998–00)
 Samet Aybaba (6 Jan 2000 – 11 April 2001)
 Hasan Gül (2001)
 Walter Meeuws (1 July 2001 – 10 Nov 2001)
 Erdoğan Arıca (2001–30 June 2002)
 Ersun Yanal (1 July 2002 – 30 June 2004)
 Erdoğan Arıca (2004)
 Oğuz Çetin (1 Oct 2004 – 23 Dec 2004)
 Ziya Doğan (1 Jan 2005 – 31 Aug 2005)
 Mesut Bakkal (Sept 1, 2005 – 30 June 2007)
 Fuat Çapa (1 July 2007 – 19 Sep 2007)
 Reinhard Stumpf (31 Aug 2007 – 29 Oct 2007)
 Bülent Korkmaz (29 Oct 2007 – 29 Jan 2008)
 Mesut Bakkal (29 Jan 2008 – 3 Nov 2008)
 Samet Aybaba (6 Nov 2008 – 31 May 2009)
 Thomas Doll (1 July 2009 – 17 Oct 2010)
 Ralf Zumdick (18 Oct 2010 – 26 Apr 2011)
 Giray Bulak (26 May 2011 – 8 June 2011)
 Fuat Çapa (11 Jun 2011 – 20 May 2013)
 Metin Diyadin (14 Jun 2013 – 20 Oct 2013)
 Mehmet Özdilek (22 Oct 2013 – 26 May 2014)
 Kemal Özdeş (28 May 2014 – 10 Jul 2014)
 Mustafa Kaplan (10 Jul 2014 – 15 Sep 2014)
 Osman Nuri Işılar (15 Sep 2014 – 23 Sep 2014)
 İrfan Buz (23 Sep 2014 – 16 Feb 2015)
 Mesut Bakkal (17 Feb 2015 – 25 May 2015)
 Mustafa Kaplan (25 May 2015 – 9 Jun 2015)
 Stuart Baxter (9 Jun 2015 – 24 Aug 2015)
 Mehmet Özdilek (1 Sep 2015 – 13 Dec 2015)
 Yılmaz Vural (24 Dec 2015 – 29 Dec 2015)
 İbrahim Üzülmez (31 Dec 2015 – 7 Nov 2016)
 Ümit Özat (8 Nov 2016 – 30 Aug 2016)
 Mesut Bakkal (30 Aug 2017 – 20 Nov 2017)
 Ümit Özat (20 Nov 2017 – 15 May 2018)
 Sezai Yıldırım (15 May 2018 – 23 May 2018)
 Erkan Sözeri (23 May 2018 – 5 Mar 2019)
 İbrahim Üzülmez (5 Mar 2019 – 30 May 2019)
 Mustafa Kaplan (18 Jun 2019 – 29 Oct 2019)
 Hamza Hamzaoğlu (31 Oct 2019 – 29 July 2020)
 Mert Nobre (3 Aug 2020 – 10 Nov 2020)
 Mustafa Kaplan (14 Nov 2020 – 1 Feb 2021)
 Mehmet Altıparmak (1 Feb 2021 - 8 Mar 2021)
 Özcan Bizati (12 Mar 2021 - 31 May 2021)
 Metin Diyadin (30 Jul 2021 - 12 Sep 2022)
 Taşkın Aksoy (27 Sep 2022 - 1 Nov 2022)
 Mustafa Dalcı (15 Nov 2022 -          )

Presidents
{|
|width="10"| 
|valign="top"|

|width="30"| 
|valign="top"|

|width="30"| 
|valign="top"|

See also
 Hacettepe SK, the reserve team of Gençlerbirliği.

References

Further reading
 Ankara Rüzgarı. Kendi Yayınları 2003  author: Tanıl Bora.

External links
Official website
Gençlerbirliği on TFF.org

 
Association football clubs established in 1923
Football clubs in Turkey
1923 establishments in Turkey
Yenimahalle, Ankara
Süper Lig clubs
Sports teams in Ankara